Shigeru Nonaka (born 9 October 1970) is a Japanese professional golfer.

Nonaka has played on the Japan Golf Tour and its Challenge Tour since 1999. He won twice on the Japan Challenge Tour in 2008 and once on the Japan Golf Tour in 2010

Professional wins (5)

Japan Golf Tour wins (1)

Japan Challenge Tour wins (4)

External links

Japanese male golfers
Japan Golf Tour golfers
Sportspeople from Kanagawa Prefecture
1970 births
Living people